Testament is an American thrash metal band from Berkeley, California. Formed in 1983, the group originally consisted of guitarists Eric Peterson and Derrick Ramirez, bassist Greg Christian, drummer Louie Clemente and lead vocalist Steve "Zetro" Souza. The band's current lineup features Peterson, lead vocalist Chuck Billy (since 1986), lead guitarist Alex Skolnick (from 1983 to 1992, and since 2005), bassist Steve Di Giorgio (from 1998 to 2005, and since 2014) and drummer Dave Lombardo (from 1998 to 1999, and since 2022).

History

1983–1997
Formed under the name Legacy in 1983 by cousins Eric Peterson (rhythm guitar, backing vocals) and Derrick Ramirez (lead guitar), the original lineup of the group also featured bassist Greg Christian, drummer Louie Clemente and lead vocalist Steve "Zetro" Souza. Clemente left the band in 1985 and was replaced by Mike Ronchette. Ramirez departed soon after and was replaced by Alex Skolnick. This lineup recorded a 4 song demo in 1985. Souza left to join Exodus in 1986 and was replaced by Chuck Billy, who the departing vocalist had suggested for his replacement. Drummer Louie Clemente returned to the band in 1986.

Also in 1986, the band was signed by Megaforce Records and subsequently changed its name to Testament, due to another band using the name Legacy. The group's lineup remained stable until October 1992, when Skolnick left due to musical differences and was replaced by Glen Alvelais, formerly of Forbidden. Clemente also left at the same time, with his place taken by Forbidden drummer Paul Bostaph. By April the following year, Bostaph had been replaced by former Exodus drummer John Tempesta, and by early 1994 Alvelais' lead guitarist role had been taken over by James Murphy.

After recording the band's sixth studio album Low, Tempesta left Testament to join White Zombie, with Jon Dette taking his place. The new drummer also left after a year, reportedly following a disagreement with vocalist Billy, subsequently joining Slayer. He was replaced briefly by Chris Kontos, formerly of Machine Head, who recorded a cover version of Judas Priest's "Rapid Fire" for the tribute album A Tribute to Judas Priest: Legends of Metal, Vol. 1 before leaving again. By 1996, only Billy and Peterson remained members of Testament, as Murphy, Christian and Kontos had all departed.

1997–2011
In 1997, Testament returned with Demonic, which featured a lineup of vocalist Chuck Billy and guitarist Eric Peterson, alongside original frontman Derrick Ramirez on bass and Gene Hoglan on drums. For the album's touring cycle, the band was rejoined by guitarist Glen Alvelais and drummer Jon Dette. In 1998, the group recorded The Gathering with returning lead guitarist James Murphy, former Death bassist Steve Di Giorgio and former Slayer drummer Dave Lombardo. For the album's promotional tour, Murphy and Lombardo were replaced by Steve Smyth and Steve Jacobs, respectively.

Jon Allen took over from Jacobs in early 2000. The following year, Billy, Peterson and Di Giorgio released First Strike Still Deadly, a collection of early songs re-recorded with former guitarist Alex Skolnick and drummer John Tempesta, as well as early vocalist Steve "Zetro" Souza on two tracks. After several temporary breaks from the group due to family issues, Allen left Testament in February 2004 and was replaced by the returning Paul Bostaph. Just two months later, Smyth also left to join Nevermore and was replaced by former Halford guitarist "Metal" Mike Chlasciak.

In February 2005, it was announced that Billy and Peterson would be reuniting with Skolnick, bassist Greg Christian, and drummers Louie Clemente and John Tempesta for a European tour. In summer 2006, Clemente was forced to leave the tour due to medical reasons, with Bostaph returning again to take his place as the sole drummer. By the end of the year, Nicholas Barker had taken over on drums. In October 2007, Bostaph returned to Testament for his fourth tenure in the group, who released their first album of new material in eight years, The Formation of Damnation, in 2008.

Since 2011
In June 2011, Gene Hoglan returned to Testament in time for the recording of Dark Roots of Earth, which was released the next year. In January 2014, Christian was replaced by Steve Di Giorgio. The lineup of Billy, Peterson, Skolnick, Hoglan and Di Giorgio recorded two albums, Brotherhood of the Snake (2016) and Titans of Creation (2020), before Hoglan once again left the band in January 2022. Nearly two months later, he was replaced by The Gathering-era drummer Dave Lombardo, who rejoined Testament right before the band's US tour in support of Titans of Creation.

Members

Current

Former

Touring

Timeline

Lineups

References

External links
Testament official website

Testament